Buxton is an  unincorporated community in Wilson County, Kansas, United States.

History
Buxton had its start in the year 1866 by the building of the Atchison, Topeka and Santa Fe Railway through that territory. Buxton was named for a railroad official.

The post office in Buxton was discontinued in 1921.

References

Further reading

External links
 Wilson County maps: Current, Historic, KDOT

Unincorporated communities in Wilson County, Kansas
Unincorporated communities in Kansas